Pablo Rodríguez Delgado (born 4 August 2001) is a Spanish professional footballer who plays as a forward for  club Brescia, on loan from Lecce.

Career

Early life and youth career 
Rodríguez was born on 4 August 2001 in Las Palmas. He started his youth career by joining the academy of UD Las Palmas in 2011. He later then joined the academy of Real Madrid CF on 2017 before moving on to Real Madrid Castilla.

Real Madrid Castilla 
Rodríguez signed his first senior contract with the reserve side Spanish giants Real Madrid CF. He made his debut against Las Rozas CF on 25 August 2019 as a substitute for Juanmi Latasa in the 82nd minute of the game. The match ended in a 1–1 draw. Pablo scored his debut goal for the club in the next match against S.S. Reyes on 16 October 2019. Rodríguez came in as a substitute in the 76th minute for Jorge Martín Camuñas and scored during the stoppage time while the team was trailing 1–0. The match ended a 1–1 draw because of Pablo's goal. He scored his second goal for the club in the 2nd match against Las Rozas CF on 12 January 2020 while the team was trailing 1–0. The match ended in a 2–2 draw. He played his last match for the club against Pontevedra CF on 1 March 2020 as a substitute for Reinier in the 69th minute of the game. The match ended 4–0 with Real Madrid losing the match. He played 11 matches and scored twice during his time with the club.

Lecce 
Rodríguez signed for the Italian side U.S. Lecce, playing the 2020–21 Serie B. He made his debut for the club on 27 December 2020 in the match against L.R. Vicenza Virtus. He started in the match as a substitute for Mariusz Stępiński, and scored his debut goal in his debut match for the club during the 72nd minute of the game. The goal was a winner as Lecce won the match 2–1. His second goal came on his second appearance on 24 January against Empoli, as Lecce drew the match 2–2. Rodríguez scored his third goal for Lecce against Brescia Calcio on 9 February, which would also end in a 2–2 draw. He scored his fourth goal in the next match on 13 February against U.S. Cremonese in the 54th minute, which was a winner goal, as the match ended in a 1–2 win for Lecce.

On 20 January 2023, Rodríguez joined Serie B club Brescia on loan.

Career statistics

Honours 
Real Madrid
UEFA Youth League: 2019–20

Lecce
Serie B: 2021–22

References

External links 
 
 Pablo Rodríguez at U.S. Lecce
 
 

Living people
2001 births
Footballers from Las Palmas
Association football forwards
Spanish footballers
U.S. Lecce players
Real Madrid Castilla footballers
Brescia Calcio players
Segunda División B players
Serie B players
Serie A players
Spanish expatriate footballers
Spanish expatriate sportspeople in Italy
Expatriate footballers in Italy